Admiral William Blake Fisher  (19 February 1853 – 8 May 1926) was a Royal Navy officer.

Naval career
Fisher was promoted to lieutenant in the Royal Navy on 30 January 1877. Promoted to captain on 31 December 1896, he was given command of the battleship HMS Anson at Queensferry in 1902 and, having been promoted to rear admiral on 23 November 1906, went on to be second-in-command of the Atlantic Fleet in 1908.

References

Royal Navy admirals
1853 births
1926 deaths
Companions of the Order of the Bath